The 2018 America East men's soccer tournament was the 30th edition of the tournament. The tournament decided the America East Conference champion and guaranteed representative into the 2018 NCAA Division I Men's Soccer Championship.  The tournament began on November 3 and concluded on November 11.

Two-time defending champions, Albany, were eliminated in the first round by UMass Lowell, meaning there would be a new America East Tournament champion for the first time since 2015. New Hampshire ultimately won the championship, defeating UMBC by a 5-0 scoreline in the final. It was New Hampshire's first America East championship they won, losing the previous four occasions.

New Hampshire was the conference's lone bid into the NCAA Tournament. They hosted Colgate for the chance to play the top overall seed, Wake Forest in the second round. There, New Hampshire lost 1–0 to Colgate.

Seeds

Bracket

Results

First round

Semifinals

Final

Awards and honors 

 Tournament MVP: Josh Bauer, New Hampshire

All-Tournament team:

 Lars Huxsohl, New Hampshire
 Antonio Colacci, New Hampshire
 Alex Valencia, New Hampshire
 Josh Bauer, New Hampshire
 Jon Bell, UMBC
 Jordan Dove, UMBC
 Jonathan Bryant, Vermont

 Kyle Saunderson, UMBC
 Owen Miller, UMass Lowell
 Roko Prsa, UMass Lowell
 Arni Jakobsson, Stony Brook
 Martieon Watson, Stony Brook
 Danny Vitiello, Albany

See also 
 2018 America East Conference Women's Soccer Tournament

References

External links 
 2018 A-East Men's Soccer Championship Central

America East Conference Men's Soccer Tournament
America East Men's Soccer
America East Men's Soccer
America East Men's Soccer
America East Men's Soccer
America East Men's Soccer Tournament